Kurtkulağı Kervansarayı (Kurtkulağı caravanserai) is a historical (Ottoman) caravanserai in Adana Province, Turkey

Geography
The caravanserai is in the Kurtkulağı village of Ceyhan ilçe (district) which is a part of Adana Province. The name of the village and the caravanserai refer to the flower Syngonium

History
The history of the notable Ottoman buildings can be traced by the vakfiye ( inscription of endowment) on the walls of the building. But during the French occupation (1919-1922) following World War I, the vakfiye in Kurtkulağı caravanserai had been dismounted. Thus the construction year is not certain. According to some sources  the building had been commissioned by Hüseyin Pasha in 1659. Some sources give  1693 as the construction date. But it is certainly not later than 1704; because it was mentioned in a firman by the sultan Ahmet III in 1704. The architect was Mehmet Aga. On 10 June 1712 the caravanserai was restored and a guard team of 50 soldiers were appointed to the caravanserai.

The building
The caravanserai  was constructed on the former trade road between Adana and Aleppo. It is an example of a type known as "caravansearai without a courtyard". It is a rectangular building with 45,75 X 23,60 m dimensions (or 150 x 77 ft) The entrance is via east. The vaults are tunnel vault type.

References

Buildings and structures in Adana Province
Ottoman caravanserais